Bill Gerrand may refer to:

Bill Gerrand (footballer, born 1916) (1916–2000), Australian rules footballer for North Melbourne
Bill Gerrand (footballer, born 1941) (1941 born), Australian rules footballer for St Kilda

See also
 Gerrand, a surname